Eudoxia Saburova (died 1620), was a Russian noblewoman, Tsesarevna of Russia as the first spouse of Tsarevich Ivan Ivanovich of Russia, son of Ivan the Terrible.

Biography
She was the daughter of Boyar Bogdan Y. Saburov.  In 1571, she participated in the Bride-show arranged to select a wife to Tsar Ivan, and while she was not chosen by the tsar for his wife, he did select her to marry his son.  In 1572, her father-in-law divorced her from his son and placed her in the Pokrovsky convent in Suzdal for childlessness.

References

 Saburova, Evdokia Bogdanovna // Ryska biografiska ordboken  : i 25 volymer. - St Petersburg - M. 1896-1918

16th-century Russian people
1620 deaths